KQEZ is a radio station airing an adult contemporary format licensed to St. Regis, Montana, broadcasting on 99.3 MHz FM. The station serves the areas of Plains, Montana; Superior, Montana; and Thompson Falls, Montana, and is owned by Anderson Radio Broadcasting, Inc.

References

External links

Mainstream adult contemporary radio stations in the United States
QEZ
Radio stations established in 2009
2009 establishments in Montana